The Olympus C-220 Zoom, also known as Olympus D-520 Zoom is an entry level digital camera from Olympus. It works as a standard USB storage device, and uses SmartMedia cards for storage.

References
 C-220 Digital Photography Review

C-220
Cameras introduced in 2002